David Prats (born 3 April 1979 in Barcelona) is a Spanish retired footballer.

References

Spanish footballers
Association football forwards
Living people
1979 births
SW Bregenz players
CE Mataró players
Terrassa FC footballers
Polideportivo Ejido footballers
Girona FC players
CF Badalona players
CE L'Hospitalet players
UE Sant Andreu footballers
Footballers from Barcelona